Chairmen of the Assembly of People's Representatives of Kyrgyzstan was the presiding officer of one of the two chambers of the Supreme Council of Kyrgyzstan.

References

Politics of Kyrgyzstan
Kyrgyzstan